The 2008–09 Basketball League Belgium Division I, for sponsorship reasons named 2008–09 Ethias League, was the 81st season of the Basketball League Belgium, the highest professional basketball league in Belgium. Spirou Charleroi won the 2009 national title, their second straight and eight total title.

Regular season

Playoffs

References

Basketball League Belgium Division I seasons
Belgian
Lea